Cédric Paquette (born August 13, 1993) is a Canadian professional ice hockey player for the HC Dinamo Minsk of the Kontinental Hockey League (KHL). Paquette was selected by the Tampa Bay Lightning in the fourth round, 101st overall, of the 2012 NHL Entry Draft and won the Stanley Cup as a member of the Lightning in 2020.

Playing career

Junior
As a youth, Paquette played in the 2006 Quebec International Pee-Wee Hockey Tournament with a minor ice hockey team from Chandler, Quebec.

Paquette played for College Notre-Dame of Montreal for three seasons scoring 28 goals. He then played major junior hockey in the Quebec Major Junior Hockey League (QMJHL) with the Montreal Juniors and Blainville-Boisbriand Armada, scoring 58 goals and 131 points, with 191 penalty minutes, in 126 games played.

Professional

Tampa Bay Lightning
Paquette was drafted in the fourth round, 101st overall by the Tampa Bay Lighting in the 2012 NHL Entry Draft. On May 3, 2013, the Lightning signed Paquette to a three-year, entry-level professional contract, assigning him to their American Hockey League (AHL) affiliate, the Syracuse Crunch, to start the 2013–14 season. On April 11, 2014, after posting 20 goals and 22 assists, with 153 penalty minutes, in 70 games played with the Crunch, the Lighting recalled Paquette.

On November 4, 2014, during the 2014–15 season the Lightning recalled Paquette from Syracuse, his second recall of the season after having previously appeared in four games with the team. Two nights later, on November 6, Paquette scored his first two NHL goals in Tampa Bay's victory over the Calgary Flames, 5–2. On January 29, 2015, Paquette scored his first career NHL hat-trick in a 5–1 win over the visiting Detroit Red Wings. On April 27, he scored his first career Stanley Cup playoff goal in a 5–2 Lightning win over the Red Wings in the Eastern Conference Quarter-finals.

On June 24, 2016, the Lightning announced that it had re-signed Paquette to a two-year contract extension. Paquette appeared in 56 games with the team in the previous season, registering six goals, eleven points, and 51 penalty minutes. His 51 penalty minutes were good for fourth on the team during the regular season. He was also one of five Lightning players to score a shorthanded goal during the 2015–2016 season. Paquette also played in 17 Stanley Cup Playoff games with the team, posting one assist and 24 penalty minutes. Paquette had played in 122 NHL games, all with the Lightning, over the previous three seasons. During that span he recorded 18 goals and 31 points to go along with 102 penalty minutes.

On November 30, 2017, the NHL Department of Player Safety announced that Paquette had been suspended for one game for boarding Boston Bruins' defenseman Torey Krug on November 29, 2017, at TD Garden. During the 2018–19 season, Paquette had a career-high 13 goals in 80 games with the Lightning.

On July 5, 2019, the Lighting signed Paquette to a two-year, $3.3 million contract extension. In 2019–20, Paquette scored seven goals and 18 points with the Lightning. He also played in 25 playoff games as the Lightning won the Stanley Cup.

Ottawa Senators and Carolina Hurricanes
On December 27, 2020, Paquette's seven-season tenure with the Lightning ended as he was traded along with Braydon Coburn and a second round pick in 2022 to the Ottawa Senators in exchange for Marián Gáborík and Anders Nilsson. After attending the Senators training camp for the pandemic delayed 2020–21 season, Paquette made his Senators debut on the club's fourth line in a 5–3 opening night victory over the Toronto Maple Leafs on January 15, 2021.

On February 13, 2021, after a very brief stint with the Senators,  Paquette, who played in nine games, was traded along with Alex Galchenyuk to the Carolina Hurricanes in exchange for Ryan Dzingel. He played out the remainder of his contract with the contending Hurricanes, collecting 3 goals and 7 points through 38 regular season games.

Montreal Canadiens
As a free agent from the Hurricanes, Paquette joined his fourth club in short succession by agreeing to a one-year, $950,000 contract with the Montreal Canadiens on July 28, 2021. He was intended to be a replacement for Corey Perry. However, he saw his ice time diminish having only scored 2 points in 24 games until being scratched from the lineup from January 20 to March 13, 2022. That day he was placed on waivers and was demoted to the Laval Rocket of the AHL. He played in 14 regular season games with Laval and 14 playoff games.

HC Dinamo Minsk 
As a free agent from the Canadiens, Paquette went overseas and accepted a contract with HC Dinamo Minsk on August 16, 2022.

Personal life
Paquette's cousin, Christopher Paquette, was also drafted by the Lightning in the 2016 NHL Entry Draft. His cousin was taken in the fifth round with the 148th overall pick.

Career statistics

Awards and honours

References

External links

1993 births
Living people
Blainville-Boisbriand Armada players
Canadian ice hockey centres
Carolina Hurricanes players
HC Dinamo Minsk players
French Quebecers
Ice hockey people from Quebec
Laval Rocket players
Montreal Canadiens players
Montreal Junior Hockey Club players
Ottawa Senators players
People from Gaspé, Quebec
Quebec Amateur Athletic Association players
Stanley Cup champions
Syracuse Crunch players
Tampa Bay Lightning draft picks
Tampa Bay Lightning players
Canadian expatriate ice hockey players in the United States
Canadian expatriate ice hockey players in Belarus